Jimmy McAuley (born 1901, date of death unknown) was an Irish football (soccer) inside forward who played professionally in Ireland and the United States.

McAuley is known to have played for Ards F.C. in the Irish League.  In 1927, he signed with Philadelphia Celtic of the American Soccer League.  Before the 1927–1928 season, a new ownership group had renamed the Philadelphia Field Club the Celtic.  They spent heavily on Irish players, but the team lasted only ten games before being suspended by the league for financial irregularities.  He then moved to the Fall River Marksmen for the last twenty-two games of the 1927–1928 season.  McAuley began the 1928–1929 season in Fall River before going on loan to J&P Coats.  He was back in Fall River the next season and played there through the 1929–1930 season.   In March 1930, the Marksmen defeated Cleveland Bruell Insurance in the 1930 National Challenge Cup.  In the first game, McAuley scored a hat trick as Fall River easily disposed of Cleveland by a score of 7 to 2.  The fall 1930 he moved to Pawtucket Rangers and played through at least 1931 with them.

References

1901 births
Year of death missing
Irish association footballers (before 1923)
Ards F.C. players
American Soccer League (1921–1933) players
Philadelphia Celtic players
Fall River Marksmen players
J&P Coats players
Pawtucket Rangers players
Association football forwards